Shangri-La Music is an indie record label based in Santa Monica, California. The label was started by Steve Bing as an expansion of Shangri-La Entertainment. Co-founders Jeff Ayeroff and Jon Rubin run the label. Shangri-La Music is a "boutique" label, which is a smaller, more specialized label and offers 360 deals. 360 deals allow the label to share in bands' touring and merchandise profits as well as digital branding rights instead of profiting off of music sales alone.

Artists
Monsters Of Folk
The Duke Spirit
Amazing Baby
Stacy Clark
pie.com
One Eskimo
The Pretenders

References

External links

IMEEM

Companies based in Los Angeles County, California
American independent record labels
Alternative rock record labels
Indie rock record labels